Geneviève Boullogne, Boullongne or Boulogne (22 August 1645 - 5 or 7 August 1708) was a French painter and member of the Académie royale de peinture et de sculpture.

Biography
She was born in Paris, the sister of the painters Bon, Madeleine and Louis. She trained under their father Louis Boullogne. and collaborated with Madeleine on the grand apartments at the Palace of Versailles. She later worked in Aix-en-Provence (where she died) and married the sculptor Jean-Jacques Clérion.

She and her sister were both admitted to the Académie royale de peinture et de sculpture on 7 December 1669. She mainly painted historical subjects and still lifes, especially of flowers and fruit.

References

1645 births
1708 deaths
French women painters
17th-century French painters
18th-century French painters
Painters from Paris
Members of the Académie royale de peinture et de sculpture